The state of Iowa does not have any major sports teams, however has many minor league teams throughout the state.

Baseball

Basketball
Cedar Rapids Silver Bullets
Cedar Valley Jaguars - IBL 2005–2006
Des Moines Dragons - IBA 1997–2001
Des Moines Heat - IBL 2005–2006
Frontier City River Dogz - MBA
Iowa Cornets - WBL 1978–1980
Iowa Wolves - NBA G League 2007–present
Tri-Cities Blackhawks - NBL, NBA 1946–1951 (now the Atlanta Hawks)
Waterloo Kings - IBL 2005–2006
Waterloo Hawks - NBL 1948-1949, NBA 1949-50, NPBL 1950-51

College
Drake Bulldogs
Iowa State Cyclones
Northern Iowa Panthers
Iowa Hawkeyes
Central Dutch
Simpson Storm
Loras Duhawks
Dubuque Spartans
Coe Kohawks
Buena Vista University

Hockey
Cedar Rapids RoughRiders, United States Hockey League 1999–present
Des Moines Capitols, International Hockey League 1972–1975
Des Moines Buccaneers, United States Hockey League 1980–present
Des Moines Ice Hawks, United States Central Hockey League 1958–1961
Des Moines Oak Leafs, United States Hockey League 1961–1963, International Hockey League 1963–1972
Dubuque Fighting Saints, United States Hockey League 1980–2001
Dubuque Fighting Saints, United States Hockey League 2010–present
Dubuque Thunderbirds, Minnesota Junior Hockey League 2001–2006, Central States Hockey League 2006–2010
Iowa Heartlanders, ECHL 2021-present
Iowa Stars/Chops, American Hockey League 2005–2009
Iowa Stars,  Central Hockey League 1969–70
Iowa Wild, American Hockey League 2013–present
North Iowa Huskies, United States Hockey League 1983–1999
North Iowa Outlaws, North American Hockey League 2005–2010
River City Lancers, United States Hockey League 2002–2004
Sioux City Musketeers, United States Hockey League 1972–present
Sioux City Sunhawks, American Amateur Hockey League 1951–52
Waterloo Black Hawks, United States Hockey League 1962–present

Soccer

Volleyball
Iowa Blizzard NVA

Mixed Martial Arts
Quad City Silverbacks  IFL (International Fight League)

Wrestling (RPW)
Iowa Stalkers

References